Williamsport is a city in, and the county seat of, Lycoming County, Pennsylvania, United States. As of 2020, it had a population of 27,754. It is the principal city of the Williamsport Metropolitan Statistical Area, which has a population of about 114,000. Williamsport is the larger principal city of the Williamsport-Lock Haven Combined Statistical Area, which includes Lycoming and Clinton counties.

The city is the cultural, financial, and commercial center of Central Pennsylvania. It is known for its sports, arts scene and food. Williamsport was settled by Americans in the late 18th century, and began to prosper due to its lumber industry. By the early 20th century, it reached the height of its prosperity. The population has since declined by approximately 40 percent from its peak of around 45,000 in 1950.

As county seat, Williamsport has the county courthouse, county prison, sheriff's office headquarters and federal courthouse, all downtown. It is also home to two institutions of higher learning, the Pennsylvania College of Technology and Lycoming College. Williamsport is the birthplace of Little League Baseball. South Williamsport, a town nearby, is the headquarters of Little League Baseball and annually hosts the Little League World Series in late summer. Other points of interest include the Hiawatha riverboat, Millionaires' Row, Peter J. McGovern Little League Museum, the Community Arts Center, the Genetti Hotel, the Susquehanna Riverwalk, and The Gallery at Penn College.

History

Early history

In 1763, the Battle of Muncy Hills took place during the French and Indian War. It was a clash between the Native Americans and colonists seeking homestead sites in Native American territory. In 1768, at the Treaty of Fort Stanwix, the British purchased the land that became Lycoming County from the Iroquois Nation who controlled the lands.

In March 1796 the first house was built in Williamsport. James Russell built his inn on what is now the northeastern corner of East Third and Mulberry Streets in downtown. On April 13, 1795 Lycoming County was formed from Northumberland County. In 1796 the first recorded childbirth in Williamsport was James Russell, the son of Mr. and Mrs. William Russell and grandson of James Russell of the Russell Inn, and the first school was built as a one-room log addition to the building that would eventually become the first Lycoming County Courthouse. In 1798 the first brick house in Williamsport was erected on Front Street, between Market and Mulberry, by Andrew Tulloh, a lawyer. The bricks were made on the banks of Grafius Run where that stream crossed Hepburn Street.

In 1799, a post office opened at the corner of Third and State Streets in what is now downtown, and the following year, a jail was constructed at the northeast corner of William and Third Streets.  The post office was later converted to a saloon.

In 1801, the town's first store was opened by William Winter on Third Street. In 1831 Jacob L. Mussina established the Repasz Band, the oldest brass band in America still in existence. On Oct. 15 1834 The West Branch Canal opened and the first boat to pass through the canal en route to Jersey Shore was that of George Aughenbaugh. The first freight carried into town was iron for the foundry of John B. Hall. The same year the enactment of the common school law by Pennsylvania Legislature led to public education here. In May 1835, the first public schools opened in Williamsport and also the town's first bank, the West Branch National Bank.

The Underground Railroad, used by enslaved African-Americans to obtain their freedom in the 30 years before the Civil War (1860–1865) included routes from states in the South, which supported slavery, to "free" states in the North and Canada. From 1830 until 1865, the underground railroad, a system of safe houses and routes for slaves escaping to freedom, operated in Lycoming County; many local abolitionists, including Daniel Hughes, served as conductors and agents.

Based on the oral history of Mamie Sweeting Diggs (1933–2011), fourth generation descent and great-granddaughter, Hughes, was a river raftsman on the Susquehanna river who had migrated from Oswego, New York. He lived on the Muncy Indian Reservation until he acquired land off Freedom Road.  During his trips transporting logs to Maryland, he brought escaped slaves back on foot from Baltimore, over Bald Eagle Mountain and hid them at his home and in the caves on Freedom Road.

Mamie's grandfather, Robert, helped his father, Daniel Hughes, hide escaped slaves in the caves behind their home on Freedom Road. They fed them, nursed the sick back to health and delivered them safely to the next "station", The Apker House in Trout Run. The Apker House was the home of Robert Fairies, abolitionist and president of the Williamsport-Elmira Railroad. The railroad ran through his property where escaped slaves were hidden in the barn and house and then loaded into railway baggage cars for the trip to Elmira, NY, the next "station."

Mamie's grandfather, Robert passed the stories to his children, including Mamie's mother, Marion.  Marion tended the family homestead, maintained Freedom Road Cemetery (where nine black Civil War vets are buried) and passed Daniel's stories down to her children.

In 1849, the Market Street Bridge was built over the West Branch Susquehanna River. It was opened as a toll bridge to cover the state's costs of $23,797. In 1854, a brewery opened. The brewery was sold to Henry Flock in 1865. This brewery was run by the Flock family until the 1940s. The Flocks' business survived Prohibition by converting to a dairy.

In 1875, the first tower clock in the United States to sound the Cambridge Quarters (Westminster Chime) was installed at Trinity Episcopal Church, a gift of Peter Herdic with bells given by the Honorable Judge J. W. Maynard. The following year, the Williamsport Hospital opened its first facility April 1 at Elmira and Edwin Streets.

In 1881, a state law ended racial segregation in Pennsylvania schools. By 1948, all schools in this area were integrated. In 1895, Harry Houdini appeared in one of his earliest performances, at the Old Fair Grounds with The Welch Brothers Circus.

Williamsport was the birthplace of the national newspaper Grit in 1882. Williamsport purportedly once had more millionaires per-capita than anywhere else in the world. For this reason, the area's local high school, the Williamsport Area High School, uses "Millionaires" as its team mascot.

Modern history 

The Flood of March 17–18, 1936 caused the river to crest at 33.9'. Flood waters reached High Street. It was known locally as the Hello, Al flood because Al Glaes, operating a short-wave radio station from his home on High Street, kept the city in touch with the rest of the world after the flood disrupted electricity and telephone service.

On June 6, 1939 the first Little League Baseball game was played on a sandlot outside Bowman Field in Williamsport. Carl Stotz conceived the idea of a Little League, and he and Bert and George Bebble managed the first three teams. In 1941 the U.S. entered World War II after the Japanese attacked Pearl Harbor. Williamsport native Joe Lockard, stationed on Oahu, gave warning of the impending attack based on radar readings. His readings were dismissed as American B17 bombers coming in from the mainland. Also in 1941 the Williamsport School Board created the Williamsport Technical Institute for high school and post-high school students. It grew into the Williamsport Area Community College, and later became Pennsylvania College of Technology.

Geography and climate

Geography

Physical geography and area landscape 
Williamsport is located at  (41.244428, −77.018738), and is bordered by the West Branch Susquehanna River to the south (with Armstrong Township, South Williamsport, Duboistown and Susquehanna Township south of the river), Loyalsock Township to the east and north, Old Lycoming Township to the north and Woodward Township to the west.

Historical places and neighborhoods 
The Peter Herdic House, Hart Building, Millionaire's Row Historic District, City Hall, Williamsport Armory, and Old City Hall are listed on the National Register of Historic Places.

Neighborhoods of Williamsport include:
 Downtown, between Hepburn Street and Basin Street, south of Little League Blvd
 Grampian Hills, the area around and north of Grampian Blvd.
 Millionaire's Row, along W. 4th Street
 Newberry, west of Lycoming Creek
 Park Avenue, south of Williamsport Hospital
 Vallamont, the area north of Rural Ave and west of Market St.
 East End, the area south of Grampian Blvd. and east of Market St.
 West Hills, the hillside and hilltop north of Dewey and west of Round Hill Road.

Climate

Under the Köppen climate classification, Williamsport falls within either a hot-summer humid continental climate (Dfa) if the  isotherm is used or a humid subtropical climate (Cfa) if the  isotherm is used. Williamsport has four distinct seasons, and lies in USDA hardiness zone 6b, with areas away from the West Branch Susquehanna River falling in zone 6a. Winters are cold and comparatively dry but typically bring a mix of rain, sleet, and snow with occasional heavy snowfall and icing. Summers are typically very warm and humid with temperatures exceeding  on 15 days per year on average; the annual count has been as high as 42 days in 1988, while only 1907 and 1979 did not reach that mark.

The first and last freezes of the season on average fall on October 16 and April 30, respectively, allowing a growing season of 168 days.

Demographics

Williamsport is the larger principal city of the Williamsport-Lock Haven, PA Combined Statistical Area, which includes the Williamsport metropolitan area (Lycoming County) and the Lock Haven micropolitan area (Clinton County) and had a combined population of 157,958 at the 2000 census.

As of the census of 2000, there were 30,706 people, 12,219 households, and 6,732 families residing in the city. The racial makeup of the city was 84.1% White, 12.7% Black, 0.4% Native American, 0.6% Asian, 0.0% Pacific Islander, 0.5% from other races, and 1.7% from two or more races. Hispanic or Latino of any race were 1.1% of the population.

There were 12,219 households, out of which 27.4% had children under the age of 18 living with them, 34.9% were married couples living together, 15.5% had a female householder with no husband present, and 44.9% were non-families. 35.1% of all households were made up of individuals, and 12.9% had someone living alone who was 65 years of age or older. The average household size was 2.30 and the average family size was 2.97.

In the city the population was spread out, with 22.5% under the age of 18, 18.0% from 18 to 24, 26.7% from 25 to 44, 19.4% from 45 to 64, and 13.5% who were 65 years of age or older. The median age was 32 years. For every 100 females, there were 97.7 males. For every 100 females age 18 and over, there were 95.9 males.

The median income for a household in the city was $25,946, and the median income for a family was $33,844. Males had a median income of $26,668 versus $20,196 for females. The per capita income for the city was $14,707. About 13.7% of families and 21.5% of the population were below the poverty line, including 24.0% of those under age 18 and 11.6% of those age 65 or over.

Crime

Government

Williamsport operates on a "Strong Mayor" form of government, meaning the mayor is given almost total administrative authority and a clear, wide range of political independence with the power to appoint and dismiss department heads without council approval and little need for public input. The mayor is Derek Slaughter.

Williamsport is located in Pennsylvania's 23rd senatorial District, Pennsylvania's 83rd House District, and Pennsylvania's 12th congressional district.

Economy
Williamsport's top ten employers are UPMC Susquehanna, the Pennsylvania State Government, the Pennsylvania College of Technology, Williamsport Area School District, Brodart Company, Springs Window Fashions, Weis Markets, West Pharmaceuticals, Shop Vac Corporation, and Textron Lycoming Engines.

Williamsport is noted for the Lycoming aircraft engines which is a division of Avco Corporation and a subsidiary of Textron. Brodart, a library supplies company, is also based in Williamsport. Shop-Vac is headquartered in the Newberry section of Williamsport and manufactures wet/dry vacuums and accessories for consumer, industrial, commercial and contractor uses. Overhead Garage Door is also located in Newberry. Bethlehem Wire Rope, a  manufacturing complex in Williamsport, with over  under roof, is the single largest wire rope manufacturing facility in North America.

Recently, interest has grown in extracting natural gas in the Williamsport area. Williamsport has become a key area in the Marcellus Shale drilling.

Lonza Group, a Swiss biotechnology and pharmaceutical company, has a large manufacturing site on the western fringes of the city, where a number of specialty chemicals are made that go into a wide array of oilfield, nutritional, personal care, and industrial applications.

The Williamsport Downtown Gateway Revitalization Project began in 2004 in order to attract more people (both citizens of the Williamsport community and visitors) to the downtown Williamsport area. The construction on the Carl E. Stotz Memorial Little League Bridge, the first of many projects, began in June 2004 and was completed in 2008.

Education
Williamsport is the home of Lycoming College and Pennsylvania College of Technology, The Commonwealth Medical College. There is also a continuing education center of Pennsylvania State University located in Williamsport.

Williamsport Area School District consists of:
 Cochran Primary School
 Hepburn Lycoming Primary School
 Jackson Primary School
 Curtin Intermediate School
 Lycoming Valley Intermediate School
 Williamsport Area Middle School
 Williamsport Area High School

Stevens Primary School was closed in 2022.

Williamsport Area School District has a renowned music program, frequently ranked in the top schools in the country each year according to the NAMM Foundation.

Private schools in the area include West Branch School, Mountain View Christian School and Williamsport Christian School and several Catholic schools in Lycoming County are run by Saint John Neumann Regional Academy.

Libraries

The James V. Brown Library is Williamsport's public library. The library has a staff of nearly 50 full and part-time employees, and offers volunteer opportunities for youth and adults. With a collection of nearly 150,000 units it offers books, DVDs, CDs, and other resources, while the library offers wireless Internet access, local history archives, and premium online reference resources. As the headquarters for the county library system, the Brown Library serves almost 87,000 patrons, some years circulating upwards of 550,000 books both in-house and through its traveling Storymobile. The James V. Brown offers preschool and early learning opportunities, as well as programs for teens and adults. The library, led by local retired physician Dr. William R. Somers, constructed a children's wing in 2009 to target educational and social resources to young people from birth through the second grade. The library has since been able to bolster its school-age programming to include teen and tween populations, offering a variety of after-school gaming clubs, arts and crafts programs, and social events that occur on a regular basis. The library's after-school café also provides reading and study incentives for young students. The Pennsylvania Department of Education, the Office of Commonwealth Libraries, and the Bureau of Library Development funds the statewide online resource "Ask Here PA", a free chat service that provides Williamsport and other Pennsylvania library patrons with access to 24/7 reference support.

Lycoming College's Snowden Library and the Pennsylvania College of Technology's Madigan Library are also located in Williamsport.

Hospitals
UPMC Susquehanna is a six hospital integrated health system including:
UPMC Susquehanna Williamsport
UPMC Susquehanna Divine Providence
UPMC Susquehanna Muncy (located east of Williamsport in Muncy)
UPMC Susquehanna Soldiers & Sailors (Wellsboro, Pennsylvania)
UPMC Susquehanna Lock Haven (Lock Haven, Pennsylvania)
UPMC Susquehanna Sunbury (Sunbury, Pennsylvania)

UPMC Susquehanna Williamsport was recognized as one of the 2011 Thomson Reuters 50 Top Heart Hospitals in the nation.

Transportation

Williamsport Regional Airport (IPT), located several miles east of the city in the borough of Montoursville, currently lacks commercial flights after American Eagle exited the market in 2021. Fullington Trailways provides daily long distance bus service from a station in the downtown to Elmira, New York, Harrisburg, New York City, and Philadelphia. Local bus service within Williamsport and to other places in Lycoming County is offered by River Valley Transit.

Williamsport is served by several major highways, including Interstate 180, U.S. Route 15, and U.S. Route 220.  I-180 and US 220 run together northeast/southwest through Williamsport, and US 15 joins (in the opposite direction) for two miles.  Once completed, Interstate 99 will enter Williamsport from the southwest on US 220 and continue north on US 15, joining only one at a time.

There is no passenger rail service, but, until the mid-20th century, Williamsport was a major transfer point between the Pennsylvania Railroad (PRR), Reading Railroad (to Jersey City and Philadelphia), and New York Central Railroad (to Lyons, NY via Corning). (Albeit, the NYC and the Reading were at one station; and the PRR was at another station, a mile away.) The longest enduring were PRR passenger services to New York City, Buffalo, Harrisburg, Washington, D.C., and Philadelphia (the Buffalo Day Express and the Dominion Express to the north and the Washington Express and Dominion Express to the south); and to Erie (Northern Express bound west, and Southern Express bound south and east). Freight rail service (west to Avis and east to Muncy) is provided by the Lycoming Valley Railroad, which has its main yard in the Newberry section of Williamsport, and offers connections to the Norfolk Southern and Canadian Pacific railroads.

The West Branch Susquehanna River is not navigable, but a dam at Hepburn Street provides a large lake for recreational boating, including outings on the mock paddlewheeler Hiawatha from Susquehanna State Park.

Sports

The Williamsport Crosscutters, a collegiate summer baseball team of the MLB Draft League, play their home games at Bowman Field. Each year, the field also hosts the MLB Little League Classic.

The Little League World Series is held annually on the south side of the West Branch Susquehanna River in South Williamsport, where Little League Baseball now has its headquarters.

The Susquehanna 500 Mini Indy Gokart Racing Series was held annually in Brandon Park. During the 2014 race, a fatal crash involving one of the go-kart operators marked the end to the yearly tradition.

Media
Local newspapers include the Williamsport Sun Gazette, Webb Weekly and The Williamsport Guardian.

The local news/talk radio stations are WRAK/WRKK (1400/1200 kHz), WWPA 1340 kHz and WXPI Community Radio 88.5 FM. Williamsport has an all-sports station, ESPN (AM) (1500 kHz). Williamsport is ranked #260 by Arbitron in terms of its radio market.

TV stations in Williamsport are served by the Scranton/Wilkes-Barre market.

A new multiplex movie theater on West 4th Street, opened May 2, 2008.

Points of interest

 Clyde Peeling's Reptiland
 Little League Museum
 Genetti Hotel
 Historic Bowman Field
Peter Herdic Transportation Museum
Thomas T. Taber Museum & Lycoming County Historical Society
Lycoming Mall
Millionaires Row
Candy Cane Lane
Downtown Williamsport
River Walk

Notable people

 Butch Alberts, former designated hitter in Major League Baseball, played for the Toronto Blue Jays
 James Milton Black, composer of hymns, choir leader and Sunday school teacher
 Gary Brown, football player, running backs coach for the Dallas Cowboys
 Ernest Callenbach, writer
 Michael Capuzzo, journalist and author
 Julia C. Collins, one of the earliest published Black female novelists
 Henry Cosgrove, Roman Catholic bishop
 Alexander Cummings, third governor of the Territory of Colorado
 Allen Ertel, U.S. congressman
 Joanna Hayes, athlete, Olympic gold medalist
 Daniel Hughes, abolitionist and conductor on the Underground Railroad
 James Hall Huling, U.S. congressman
 Alize Johnson, basketball player, Chicago Bulls
 Lawrence Lessig, Roy L. Furman Professor of Law at Harvard Law School, former director of the Edmond J. Safra Center for Ethics at Harvard University, and candidate for the Democratic Party's nomination for President of the United States in the 2016 U.S. presidential election
 Harry J. Lincoln, early 1900s music publisher and composer
 Joseph Lockard (October 30, 1922 - November 2, 2012), U.S. soldier and SCR-270 radar staffer/initial, primary source of the Imperial Japanese Navy Air Service's impending attack on Pearl Harbor 
 Jack Losch, football player
 George Luks, Ashcan School painter
 Henry J. Lutcher, businessman
 Tom Marino, U.S. congressman, U.S. Attorney, District Attorney
 Jamie McAndrew, MLB player for the Milwaukee Brewers
 Malcolm Muir, United States district judge noted for the R. Budd Dwyer case
 Mike Mussina,  member of the National Baseball Hall of Fame
 Bob Pellegrini, American football player
 H. Beam Piper, science-fiction author
 Bill Reifsnyder, two-time U.S. national marathon champion
 Severin Roesen (1815? – 1872), still-life painter
 Sal Rosato, football player
 Tina Russell, adult film actress
 William Schreyer, financier
 H. Paul Shuch, SETI scientist
 Trisha Rae Stahl, actress
 Carl Stotz, founder of Little League Baseball
 Mary Szybist, poet, winner of the National Book Award for Poetry, 2013
 Mike Taylor, basketball coach
 Martha Dewing Woodward, artist and art teacher in Paris, Miami, and New York
 Weldon Wyckoff, baseball player

See also

National Register of Historic Places listings in Lycoming County, Pennsylvania

References
Notes

References

Further reading

External links

 City of Williamsport
 Williamsport, PA City Portal

 
1769 establishments in Pennsylvania
Cities in Lycoming County, Pennsylvania
Cities in Pennsylvania
County seats in Pennsylvania
Pennsylvania populated places on the Susquehanna River
Populated places established in 1769